Pakistan Air Force (PAF) hospitals are secondary and tertiary care hospitals dedicated to provide health facilities to the uniformed and civilian personnel of PAF. These hospitals are situated at various bases of PAF and include:

Branches
 PAF Hospital, Islamabad
 PAF Hospital, Sargodha
 PAF Hospital, Lahore
 PAF Hospital, Mianwali
 PAF Hospital, Jacobabad
 PAF Hospital Rafiqui, Shorkot
 PAF Hospital Faisal Base, Karachi
 PAF Hospital Masroor base, Karachi

The doctors and the nurses are borrowed from the Army Medical Corps, Army Dental Corps and Armed Forces Nursing Services of Pakistan Army. However, lately the Air force has also started to induct the doctors directly. Soon after the inauguration of its first ever medical college here in Air University Islamabad, there was a dire need to meet the requirements of medical students and patients. Pakistan Air Force in Islamabad launched a state of the art 600 bed Hospital providing medical, surgical, gynae, urology, cardiology, ENT, eye, radiology, pathology, dermatology, psychiatry, and physiotherapy services. PAF Hospital Islamabad Unit 2 is open for general public, it is not specifically for the uniform personnel.

See also 
 Combined Military Hospital (CMH)
 Pakistan Air Force

References

External links
PAF Hospital

Military medical facilities in Pakistan
Military medical organizations
Hospital networks in Pakistan
Pakistan Air Force